The t kofschip (the merchant-ship), t fokschaap (the breeding sheep), also often referred to as kofschiptaxi or soft ketchup (among foreign language learners) rule is a mnemonic that determines the endings of a regular Dutch verb in the past indicative/subjunctive and the ending of the past participle. This rule should not be confused with the so-called T-rules (t-regels).

Rule
The rule goes as follows:

For example:

Because of the idiosyncrasies of Dutch spelling, some forms are spelled in unexpected ways. Words may not end in a double consonant, so the past participles gerust, geland and gered do not get an additional -d. See Dutch orthography for more information.

Because of regular final-obstruent devoicing, the past participle ending is pronounced with a voiceless  even though d is spelled. When the participle is inflected (in accordance with a following noun), the devoicing is undone, like in other words. Thus geland , geleegd , geproefd  inflect to gelande , geleegde , geproefde  respectively.

Further details

On a phonological level, the rule is a form of voicing assimilation: the consonant of the past-tense ending takes on the voicing of whatever sound precedes it. Thus, the endings beginning with voiceless -t- are used after voiceless consonants, while the endings beginning with voiced -d- are used after voiced consonants and vowels (which are always voiced). Similar rules appear in several other Germanic languages, such as Swedish and English. In English, the rule is not usually reflected in spelling, but is still regular in pronunciation: compare raced  and razed .

Because the rule is intended only as an educational tool, it only covers the basic Dutch vocabulary which consists mostly of native Germanic verbs. It also cannot be used for initialisms. In this case, only the underlying voicing of the pronounced final consonant can be used to determine the ending. For example:

References

Further reading
 
 Also as: 
 

Dutch language
Dutch words and phrases
Mnemonics